PS Duchess of Fife was a passenger vessel built for the London and South Western Railway and London, Brighton and South Coast Railway in 1899.

History

The ship was built by the Clydebank Engineering and Shipbuilding Company and launched on 28 April 1899 by Miss Brown, daughter of the Marine Superintendent of the railway companies. She was constructed for a joint venture between the London and South Western Railway and the London, Brighton and South Coast Railway for the passenger trade to the Isle of Wight.

She was taken over in 1923 by the Southern Railway. She was withdrawn in 1928 and sold for breaking by G.B. Pas and Sons in Bolnes in 1929.

References

1899 ships
Steamships of the United Kingdom
Paddle steamers of the United Kingdom
Ships built on the River Clyde
Ships of the London and South Western Railway
Ships of the London, Brighton and South Coast Railway
Ships of the Southern Railway (UK)